Elster may refer to:

Places
 Black Elster (Schwarze Elster), a river in Germany
 White Elster (Weiße Elster), a river in Germany and the Czech Republic
 Elster Viaduct, a railway bridge over the White Elster
 Elster Viaduct (Pirk), a road bridge over the White Elster
 Bad Elster, a spa town in the Vogtlandkreis district, in the Free State of Saxony, Germany
 Bad Elster Spa Museum
 Elster (Elbe), a village and former municipality in Saxony-Anhalt, Germany
 Elster Mountains, in Saxony and the Czech Republic
 Kleine Elster, a river of Brandenburg, Germany
 Amt Kleine Elster (Niederlausitz), an Amt (collective municipality) in the district of Elbe-Elster, Germany

People

Surname
 Charles Harrington Elster (born 1957), American writer, broadcaster, and logophile
 Charlotte Elster, German-American physicist
 Else Elster (1910-1998), German film actress
 Erwin Elster (1887-1977), Polish painter and pedagogue
 Gottlieb Elster (1867-1917), German sculptor.
 Ingolf Elster Christensen (1872-1943), Norwegian jurist, military officer, county governor and politician
 Jennifer Elster (active from 2001), American experimental artist, filmmaker, writer, photographer and performer
 Jon Elster, (born 1940), Norwegian social and political theorist
 Julius Elster (1854-1920), German teacher and physicist
 Kevin Elster (born 1964), American Major League Baseball player
 Kristian Elster (born 1841) (1841-1881), Norwegian novelist, journalist, literary critic and theatre critic; the father
 Kristian Elster (born 1881) (1881-1947), Norwegian novelist, literary historian, theatre critic and biographer; the son
 Magli Elster (1912-1993), Norwegian psychoanalyst, literary critic, poet and translator
 Torolf Elster (1911-2006), Norwegian journalist, editor and writer

Other uses
 Battle on the Elster, fought 1080 near the White Elster between king Henry IV of Germany and anti-king Rudolf of Rheinfelden
 Elster glaciation (Elsterian Stage)
 Elster Valley Railway (White Elster)
 Operation Elster (German for magpie) a 1944 German infiltration attempt on North America during World War II
 Pützer Elster, a light aircraft

See also
 C. A. Elster Building, a historic commercial building in Springville, California
 Elbe-Elster, a Kreis (district) in the southern part of Brandenburg, Germany
 Elstra, a town in the district of Bautzen, in the Free State of Saxony, Germany
 The Stranger from Elster Street (German: Die Fremde aus der Elstergasse), a 1921 German silent drama film
 Zahna-Elster, a town in the district of Wittenberg, Saxony-Anhalt, Germany
 

Surnames of German origin
Surnames of Norwegian origin

pl:Elstera